Pownall Hall is a former country house in Wilmslow, Cheshire, England.  It was remodelled in 1830 as "a red sandstone Georgian house dressed up in the Tudor style".  In 1886 it was bought by the Manchester brewer Henry Boddington, who transformed it "into a showcase for the most up-to-date work of the Arts and Crafts Movement".  The architect was William Ball of the Ball and Elce partnership of Manchester.  Much of the decoration and furniture design was carried out by members of the Century Guild, an organisation founded in 1882 by A. H. Mackmurdo.  In addition "lots of pretty, small-scale  bits of decoration" were added to the façade.  The house is recorded in the National Heritage List for England as a designated Grade II* listed building.  As of 2011 the building is in use as a school.

See also

 Grade II* listed buildings in Cheshire East
 Listed buildings in Wilmslow

References

External links
 Pownall Hall Preservation Appeal (includes historical and architectural information)

Country houses in Cheshire
Private schools in the Borough of Cheshire East
Houses completed in 1830
Grade II* listed buildings in Cheshire
Arts and Crafts architecture in England
Grade II* listed houses
1830 establishments in England
Wilmslow